The 2009 Pacific Mini Games was held in the Cook Islands from 21 September to 2 October. It was the 8th edition of the Pacific Mini Games.

Torch lighters were the athletes Daniel Tutai and Patricia Taea, the Cook Islands' junior sportsman and sportswoman of the year for 2008.

Participating countries
There were 21 countries participating at the 2009 Games:

Note: A number in parentheses indicate the size of a country's team (athletes and officials, where known).

Sports
15 sports were contested at the 2009 Games:

Note: Numbers in parentheses indicate the number of medal events contested in each sport (where known).

See also
 Athletics at the 2009 Pacific Mini Games
 Tennis at the 2009 Pacific Mini Games

Notes
 Errors – The official website lists all 2009 medal winners, but while athletes' names appear correct, their recorded nationalities are mismatched in some cases. e.g. New Caledonians are listed as from Federated States of Micronesia, Fijians are listed as from Niue).

 Athletics – There were 21 men's events and 20 women's events contested.

 Bowls – Singles, pairs, triples and fours were played for both men and women for a total of eight events. In the women's competition, the Cook Islands won all events except the singles for which the gold medal was claimed by Niue. The Cook Islands' David Akaruru also won the men's singles gold medal, with the remaining men's events being won by Fiji.

 Boxing – In 2009, although there were ten weight divisions scheduled, medals were only ultimately awarded in nine of them. Only two boxers were entered for the Flyweight 51 kg division. Samoa's Kaisa Ioane was given a walkover when his Cook Islands opponent did not appear for their bout. As no contest took place, no medals could be awarded. Of the remaining nine divisions: one title was won by each of Samoa, American Samoa, and New Caledonia, two titles were won by Nauru, and four titles were won by Tahiti.

 Golf – Cook Islands won all four gold medals. 

 Netball – Fiji, PNG and Cook Islands were the medallists.

 Rugby league sevens – Fiji beat Cook Islands in the final, Samoa won the bronze against Tonga.

 Sailing – In the dinghy events, host nation Cook Islands won three gold medals and Tahiti won one gold medal. New Caledonia won two gold medals in the Hobie 16.

 Squash – Papua New Guinea took three gold medals and New Caledonia one (medals for New Caledonia incorrectly recorded for Federated States of Micronesia on official website medal listing). (

 Weightlifting – There were eight divisions for men, and five divisions for women, with three gold medals offered within each division.

References

Sources

External links
 2009 Pacific Mini Games webpage

 
Pacific Games by year
Pacific Games
P
P
International sports competitions hosted by the Cook Islands
Pacific Mini Games
Pacific Mini Games